Veronika Havlíčková (born 8 November 1987 in Broumov) is a Czech former pair skater. Skating with Karel Štefl between 2001 and 2004, she competed at the European Championships and on the Grand Prix series, and won a bronze medal on the Junior Grand Prix series.

Programs
(with Stefl)

Results 
(with Stefl)

References

External links 
 

Czech female pair skaters
1982 births
Living people
People from Broumov
Sportspeople from the Hradec Králové Region